The 1973 Indiana Hoosiers football team represented the Indiana Hoosiers in the 1973 Big Ten Conference football season. The Hoosiers played their home games at Memorial Stadium in Bloomington, Indiana. The team was coached by Lee Corso, in his first year as head coach of the Hoosiers.

Schedule

Personnel

Season summary

Illinois

Arizona

Kentucky

at West Virginia

at Minnesota

Ohio State

at Wisconsin

at Michigan

Northwestern

at Michigan State

Purdue

Statistics

Passing

Rushing

Receiving

Awards
All-Big Ten (1st Team)
Bill Armstrong, SE
John Babcock, C
Chuck Sukurs, C
Jim Wenzel, P

References

Indiana
Indiana Hoosiers football seasons
Indiana Hoosiers football